The Eye, Ear, Nose and Throat (Eye and ENT) Hospital of Fudan University, formerly the Shanghai Jewish Hospital (also B'nai B'rith Foundation Polyclinic), is a teaching hospital in Shanghai, China, affiliated with the Shanghai Medical College of Fudan University and the Red Cross Society of Shanghai. It is rated Grade 3, Class A, the highest rating in the Chinese medical system.


Overview 
There are 374 beds on the main Fenyang Road campus of the hospital, which comprises the departments of Ophthalmology, Otorhinolaryngology, Radiotherapy, Anesthesia, Emergency Medicine, Stomatology, Laser Therapy and Plastic Surgery.

The hospital has 1,112 employees. It treats 1.8 million outpatients and performs 90,000 surgeries per year, with patients coming from all over China. In addition to the main campus at Fenyang Road in Xuhui District, it has a second site on Baoqing Road, and two other campuses in Pudong and Minhang, respectively. The Minhang campus has an additional 350 beds.

History 
The hospital was founded in 1934 by the B'nai B'rith Shanghai Lodge with funds donated by the prominent Jewish businessman Elly Kadoorie. It was originally called the B'nai B'rith Foundation Polyclinic. In 1940, it opened a dispensary which provided free medicine to the indigent.

After the outbreak of the Pacific War, the Russian Jewish community in the city took over the clinic in 1942, moved it to the current site on Route Pichon (now Fenyang Road), and expanded it into a hospital. On 16 January 1943, the renamed Shanghai Jewish Hospital was opened. At the time it had 60 beds and state-of-the-art equipment including the X-ray machine, and it provided treatment to the poor free of charge. I. K. Kagan served as chairman of the hospital, and S. Citrin, chairwoman of the ladies' committee, oversaw the house management and the kitchen.

After the founding of the People's Republic of China, the Eye, Ear, Nose and Throat (Eye and ENT) Hospital of the Shanghai Medical College was established in 1952 by professors Hu Maolian and Guo Bingkuan on the site of the Jewish Hospital. It adopted the current name in 2000, when the Shanghai Medical College was merged into Fudan University to become its medical school.

The hospital opened a second site on Baoqing Road in 2002, a Pudong campus in 2003, and a Pujiang, Minhang, campus in 2017.

References 

Teaching hospitals in Shanghai
Fudan University
Hospitals established in 1934
1934 establishments in China
Hospitals established in 1952
1952 establishments in China
Xuhui District
Minhang District
Jews and Judaism in Shanghai
B'nai B'rith
Otorhinolaryngology organizations
Eye hospitals
Pudong
Red Cross Society of China